Vijay Kumar Kashyap (19 February 1965 – 18 May 2021) was an Indian politician.

Biography
He belonged to the Bharatiya Janata Party. He was a member of Seventeenth Legislative Assembly of Uttar Pradesh representing the Charthawal assembly constituency.

He was appointed the Minister of state in a Yogi Adityanath cabinet on 21 August 2019.

He died on 18 May 2021, succumbing to COVID-19 aged 52or 56 (disputed).

References 

1965 births
2021 deaths
Deaths from the COVID-19 pandemic in India
People from Muzaffarnagar district
Uttar Pradesh MLAs 2017–2022
Bharatiya Janata Party politicians from Uttar Pradesh